The Aeronca L-3 group of observation and liaison aircraft were used by the United States Army Air Corps in World War II.  The L-3 series were adapted from Aeronca's pre-war Tandem Trainer and Chief models.

Design and development
In 1941, the United States Army Air Corps ordered four examples of the Aeronca 65 TC Defender, designated YO-58, for evaluation of the suitability of light aircraft for observation and liaison purposes. (It also placed similar orders with Piper and Taylorcraft Aircraft). Service tests during the US Army's annual maneuvers proved successful, and resulted in large orders being placed. In 1942, the O-58 was redesignated L-3.

When American forces went into combat after Pearl Harbor, the Army Air Force used the L-3 in much the same manner as observation balloons were used during World War I—spotting activities and directing artillery fire. It was also used for liaison and transport duties and short-range reconnaissance which required airplanes to land and take off in short distances from unprepared landing strips. Liaison pilots would train on L-3s before moving on to front-line aircraft like the Piper L-4 or the Stinson L-5. Some L-3s were shipped to North Africa, and subsequently given to the Free French Forces in the area at the time. At least one of the aircraft served with US forces in Italy.And minimally one other did service in Normandy, as reported by the Detroit Free Press on 25 June 1944, with a photograph indicating transport of medical supplies to the advancing front-line regiments.

The TG-5 was a three-seat training glider of 1942 based upon the O-58 design. This aircraft retained the O-58's rear fuselage, wings, and tail while adding a new front fuselage in place of the engine. In all, Aeronca built 250 TG-5 gliders for the Army. The Navy received three as the LNR-1.

Variants

O-58 designation replaced by L-3 designation in April 1942
YO-58 – Four aircraft with a  Continental YO-170-3 engine.
O-58 / L-3 – production order of 50, most used for training in the US.
O-58A / L-3A – Fuselage widened four inches and extended greenhouse canopy. 20 built.
O-58B / L-3B – Modified canopy and additional radio equipment. 875 built.
O-58C / L-3C – As O-58B/L-3B but with radio equipment removed for use as trainer. 490 built.
L-3D – Aeronca 65TF Defender. 11 aircraft impressed.
L-3E – Aeronca 65TC Defender. 12 aircraft impressed. Continental engine. 
L-3F – Aeronca 65CA Defender. 19 aircraft impressed.
L-3G – Aeronca 65L Super Chief with side by side seating. 4 aircraft impressed. Lycoming engine.
L-3H – Aeronca 65TL Defender. 1 aircraft impressed) Lycoming engine.
L-3J – Aeronca 65TC Defender 1 additional aircraft impressed. Continental engine. 
JR-1 – Three L-3Cs supplied to the US Navy.
TG-5 – 250 were built as training gliders for the USAAC.
TG-33 – TG-5 converted for prone pilot.
LNR – Three TG-5s supplied to the US Navy.

Operators

 Brazilian Air Force L-3C

 Cuban Air Force - received 11 L-3Bs under Lend-Lease.

 Chilean Air Force
30 L-3B delivered to Chile via Lend-Lease program in 1943, all delivered to civil aero clubs. 4 Survivors (CC-KGA at La Ligua, CC-SHA at Chile's Aviation Museum. Two examples in the hands of restorers at Tobalaba airfield, Santiago, and Los Angeles.)

 Dominican Air Force - received 3 L-3Bs in 1943.

 United States Army Air Forces
 United States Navy

 Aviación Militar – received three L-3Bs.

Surviving aircraft

Aside from 15 L-3s (2 L-3, 7 L-3B, and 6 L-3C) that remain on the US civil registry as of June 2016, a number have also found their way into museums

 42-7796 - O-58A airworthy with Mark A. Henry of Dickinson, Texas

42-7798 – O-58A airworthy with Blake W. Henderson of Westmoreland, Tennessee.
 42-14773 – L-3 airworthy with Audie L. Hollon of Milan, Missouri.
 42-36152 – O-58B airworthy with Lee H. Montgomery in Corsicana, Texas. Previously with the Alamo Liaison Squadron in San Antonio, Texas.
 42-36200 – L-3B on static display at the National Museum of the United States Air Force at Wright-Patterson AFB near Dayton, Ohio.
 42-36639 – L-3D on static display at the Silent Wings Museum at Lubbock Preston Smith International Airport in Lubbock, Texas
 43-1844 – O-58B airworthy at the Port Townsend Aero Museum in Port Townsend, Washington.
 43-26772 – L-3B on static display at the Air Zoo in Kalamazoo, Michigan.
 43-26819 – L-3B on static display at the Museo Nacional Aeronáutico y del Espacio in Santiago, Chile.
 43-27184 - L3-B Being restored in Sturgis, Mi. 058B-13213 NC 47262
 Unknown – L-3B on static display at the Museum of Flight in Seattle, Washington.
 Unknown – L-3B airworthy at the Cavanaugh Flight Museum in Addison, Texas.
 Unknown – L-3 airworthy at the Wings of Eagles Discovery Center in Elmira, New York.
 Unknown – L-3 on display at the Vintage Flying Museum in Fort Worth, Texas.
 Unknown – L-3B airworthy at the Western Antique Aeroplane & Automobile Museum in Hood River, Oregon.
 Unknown – L-3E airworthy with Air Group One of the Commemorative Air Force in El Cajon, California.
 Unknown – L-3E under restoration with the Spirit of Tulsa of the Commemorative Air Force in Tulsa, Oklahoma.
 Unknown – L-3E airworthy with the Missouri Wing of the Commemorative Air Force in Portage Des Sioux, Missouri.
 Unknown – O-58B airworthy with Nicholas S. Kapotes of Pompton Plains, New Jersey.
 43-26861 – O-58B airworthy with James S. Tate of Nashville, Tennessee.
 Unknown – L-3 on static display at the National D-Day Memorial in Bedford, Virginia.
 058B2692 – L-3B airworthy with Air1 Aircraft of Westfield, Massachusetts.
 058B6212 – O-58B airworthy with Bruce Gapstur of Belle Plaine, Iowa.
 058B-8272 – O-58B airworthy with Todd H. Dickens of Charlotte, North Carolina.
 31316 – 65-TAC-L3 airworthy at La Victoria de Chacabuco Airport in Chile. Registered as CC-AVO.

Specifications (L-3C)

See also

Aeronca Chief family

Notes

References

External links

 L-3 page at the National Museum of the United States Air Force
 L-3 page at Warbird Alley
 L-3 page at Museo Nacional Aeronáutico y del Espacio de Chile

L-03, Aeronca
Aeronca aircraft
High-wing aircraft
Single-engined tractor aircraft
Aircraft first flown in 1941